Albisu is a hamlet (caserío) in the Salto Department of northwestern Uruguay.

Geography

Population
In 2011 Albisu had a population of 544.
 
Source: Instituto Nacional de Estadística de Uruguay

References

External links
INE map of Albisu

Populated places in the Salto Department